Ojakkala is a village in the Vihti municipality, 45 kilometers from Helsinki, Finland. Next to village is Enäjärvi. The population of Ojakkala is about 2,500. Ojakkala's services include, among other things, a primary school (Ojakkalan koulu) and the K-Market grocery store. There is also a historic sports hall (Ojakkalan urheilutalo) in the village, which currently serves as a venue for meetings and celebrations.

In Ojakkala, there is a ski resort Vihti Ski Center, a golf resort Vihti Golf Center and an amusement park PuuhaPark.

See also
 Veikkola
 Tervalampi

References

Villages in Finland
Vihti